Anna of Austria (1275, Vienna, Austria – 1327, Legnica) was a daughter of Albert I of Germany and his wife Elisabeth of Tirol. She was a member of the House of Habsburg.

First marriage 
Anna first married in 1295 in Graz. Her husband was Herman, Margrave of Brandenburg-Salzwedel. They had four children:

 Jutta of Brandenburg (1297–1353), heiress of Coburg, married to Count Henry VIII of Henneberg
 John (1302–1317), succeeded his father, but died young
 Matilde of Brandenburg (died 1323) married Henry IV the Faithful
 Agnes of Brandenburg (1297–1334), heiress of the Altmark, married with margrave Waldemar of Brandenburg (1281–1381) and in 1319 to Duke Otto of Brunswick-Göttingen (1290–1344).

In 1308, Herman died, and their son John succeeded him.

Second marriage 
In 1310 Anna married Henry VI the Good, Duke of Wrocław, son of Henry V the Fat and his wife Elisabeth of Greater Poland. They had three daughters:

 Elisabeth of Brieg (ca. 1311 – 20 February? 1328), married before 10 January 1322 to Duke Konrad I of Oleśnica.
 Euphemia of Brieg (Ofka) (ca. 1312 – 21 March after 1384), married before 29 November 1325 to Duke Bolesław the Elder of Niemodlin (Falkenberg).
 Margaret of Brieg (ca. 1313 – 8 March 1379), Abbess of St. Clara in Wrocław (1359).

Anna died in 1327 in Legnica. When Henry died ten years later without any male heirs, Wrocław was merged with the Bohemian crown.

References 

1275 births
1327 deaths
13th-century House of Habsburg
14th-century House of Habsburg
14th-century German women
People from the Duchy of Austria
Nobility from Vienna
Daughters of kings
Remarried royal consorts